Manniva is a village in Jõelähtme Parish, Harju County in northern Estonia.

Manniva had a population of 39 in 2001, 47 in 2009, and as of 2011, 66 people lived in the village.

Gallery

References

External links 
 Names of Estonian settlements (after renaming post-soviet period), http://www.eki.ee 
 Estonia's population statistics; "Statistics Estonia" on the website of the state agency

Villages in Harju County